Guru Uchaththula Irukkaru is a 2017 Indian Tamil-language comedy drama film directed by B. Dhandapani and starring Guru Jeeva and Aara.

Cast 
Guru Jeeva as Virat
Aara  as Tamizhselvi
M. S. Bhaskar as Uthamaputhiran
Pandiarajan
Imman Annachi
Namo Narayana
Sriranjini
Thalapathy Dinesh
Crane Manohar
Naadodigal Gopal

Production 
Newcomer Guru Jeeva, who studied visual communications, plays the lead role along with Aara , who starred in Paisa (2016).

Soundtrack 
Music by Taj Noor with lyrics by Meenakshi Sundaram, Pa. Vijay and Snehan. A writer from Hindu Tamil Thisai called the song "Pothum Otha Sollu" melodious.

Reception 
The film released in November of 2017.

A critic from The Times of India wrote that the film is "as engaging as watching paint dry". A critic from Maalai Malar called the film "average". A critic from Nettv4u opined that "Guru Uchaththula Irukkaru doesn’t have anything special".

References 

Indian comedy-drama films